Kadamba Transport Corporation (Konkani: कदंब येरादारी म्हामंडळ) abbreviated as KTC is a Government of Goa road transport undertaking. It was set up in 1980 by then Chief Minister Pratapsingh Rane. Goa has long been dependent on privatised bus-transport, and the blue-and-red-and-white Kadamba buses are an exception to this rule. While the KTC has provided transport and connectivity to Goa's main towns and rural hinterland, it has also, in recent years, faced charges of mismanagement, politicisation and corruption in some of its deals.

The corporation is named after the Kadambas of Goa and the royal lion emblem of the Kadambas is used a logo on its buses. The lion emblem logo became an integral part of KTCL since its inception in 1980 when the corporation was set up to provide better public transport service.

In 2015–16, KTC had a total traffic revenue of 87.33 crore.

Objective 

Kadamba Transport Corporation was created to provide "safe, reliable, time-saving, efficient, comfortable and affordable" services for Goa's multitude (See KTC's citizens' charter  Wayback Machine ). To a large extent, it is seen as having accomplished this objective, although the cost for providing this service has been substantial. It is heavily subsidized by the government and is reportedly in the red, like most of India's state run road transport undertakings.

Bus stands 

The KTC operates 15 bus stands and 4 depots covering almost all of Goa's cities and towns.  Their services cover the length and breadth of Goa.  The ticket prices are reasonable and for intra-Goa travel are purchased on the bus itself from the onboard bus conductor. These buses tend to be packed with passengers during peak hours and there are some non-stop "shuttle" mini-bus services as well, connecting cities like Panjim, Margao, Vasco and Ponda. Like the other bus services in Goa, they have special rates for children, students and senior citizens.

Shuttle services 

KTC provides point-to-point services through what it calls "mini/midi buses" connecting the major commercial towns such as Panjim, Margao, Vasco, Mapusa, Ponda, Curchorem and Belgaum. These services have less waiting time and only seating passengers with additional facility of drop into the city during office timing.

Pilgrimage services 

KTC offers its Ashtavinayaka Tours, by air-conditioned buses, during the weekends. The Chintamani of the Thevur, Mayureshwar of Morgao, Sidhivinayak of Sidhtek, Mahaganpati of Ranjangao, Vighneshawar of Ozar, Girijatmak of Lenyadri, Varadvinayak of Mahad, Ballaleshwar of Pali are among the places covered. Booking can be done at booking offices at bus-stands or at depots of the KTC.
Velankanni pilgrimages to the shrine at Nagapattinam in Tamil Nadu are also conducted by KTC during the novena and feast.  Booking needs to be done in advance.

School services 
KTC also operates special services for schools, at their convenience and needs. The services are operated on the monthly passes issued to the students based on the amount collected by the school management.  The services are offered to the following schools:

 Our Lady of Rosary High School Donapaula
 Sharada Mandir High School Miramar
 Kendriya Vidyalaya I.N.S. Mandovi Verem
 Hegdewar High School Panaji
 Sanjay School Porvorim
 Vidhya Prabhodini High school Porvorim
 St. Joseph High School Verna
 Regina Mundi High School Vasco
 St. Theresa High School Vasco
 Don Bosco High School Netravali
 Almeida High School, Ponda (run by Goa Vidyaprasarak Mandal)

For interstate travel however, it is highly recommended that tickets be purchased reasonably well in advance especially during the summer and winter rush and the tourist seasons.  This is in spite of special services running during these times.

Hiring of buses 

KTC also hires out its air-conditioned Volvo, luxury, semi-luxury, mini-bus and air-conditioned mini-bus vehicles on both "round contract" and "drop contract" at varying rates. Students can access these services, at a concessional rate of two rupees less per kilometre. Minimum amount charged for the trip varies, depending on the class and size of the vehicle.

Financial structure 

Official sources (KTC, citizen's charter, 2007) say the entire share capital of the company—totalling Rs 299 million—is held by the Government of Goa.  The capital has been invested to build infrastructure—like constructing depots, bus-stands, central workshops, and acquire buses.

Administration 
Carlos Almeida, the Bharatiya Janata Party legislator from Vasco is the Chairman of Kadamba Transport Corporation. Derrick Pereira Neto is the managing director of the corporation.

Fleet 
As of now, KTC has a fleet of 565 buses, made by companies such as Tata, Ashok Leyland, Eicher Motors, Corona (Deccan Auto) and Volvo.

KTC also runs fifty Olectra-BYD K9 electric buses assembled by Olectra Greentech (MEIL). Thirty buses were put into use from June 2021. Twenty electric buses were delivered in December 2021.

According to its 2005 citizen's charter, it operated 87,690 kilometres per day, but concedes that it is "unable to meet the entire demand of public transport". It stated that the liberalisation policy and the amendment in the Indian Motor Vehicles Act 1988 together with the "increasing input cost in terms of material and labour" has had a "direct impact" on the KTC's cost of operation.

References

External links 
 Official website

Transport in Goa
Bus companies of India
State agencies of Goa
Companies based in Goa
State road transport corporations of India
1980 establishments in Goa, Daman and Diu
Indian companies established in 1980
Transport companies established in 1980
Government agencies established in 1980